Theodor Fitzau (10 February 1923 in Köthen, Germany (later East Germany) – 18 March 1982 in Groß-Gerau, West Germany) was a racing driver from East Germany.  Generally a Formula Two racer, he participated in one World Championship Grand Prix, the 1953 German Grand Prix, driving an AFM owned by fellow driver Helmut Niedermayr.  He retired from the race, scoring no championship points.

Complete World Championship results
(key)

References
 

1923 births
1982 deaths
People from Köthen (Anhalt)
German racing drivers
AFM Formula One drivers
Racing drivers from Saxony-Anhalt
East German Formula One drivers